The 2014 V8 Supercar season was the eighteenth year in which V8 Supercars contested the senior Australian touring car series. It was the 55th year of touring car racing in Australia since the first runnings of the Australian Touring Car Championship, now known as the International V8 Supercars Championship, and the fore-runner of the present day Bathurst 1000, the Armstrong 500.

The season began on 27 February at the Adelaide Street Circuit and finished on 7 December at the Homebush Street Circuit. 2014 featured the eighteenth V8 Supercar Championship, consisting of 38 races at 14 events covering all six states and the Northern Territory of Australia as well as an event in New Zealand. There was also a stand-alone event supporting the 2014 Australian Grand Prix. The season also featured the fifteenth second-tier Dunlop V8 Supercar Series, contested over seven rounds. For the seventh time a third-tier series was run, the Kumho Tyres V8 Touring Car Series.

Race calendar

Dates sourced from:

IVC – International V8 Supercar Championship
DVS – Dunlop V8 Supercar Series
KVTC – Kumho Tyres V8 Touring Car Series
NC – Non-championship

International V8 Supercars Championship

Dunlop V8 Supercar Series

MSS Security V8 Supercars Challenge

References

External links
 

Supercar seasons